Saint-Thual (Gallo: Saent-Tuau) is a commune in the Ille-et-Vilaine department in Brittany in northwestern France.

Population
Inhabitants of Saint-Thual are called Saint-Thualais in French.

See also
Communes of the Ille-et-Vilaine department
Jean-Marie Valentin

References

External links

Mayors of Ille-et-Vilaine Association 

Communes of Ille-et-Vilaine
Micronations in France